Artemisia species (wormwoods, mugworts and sagebrushes) are used as food plants by the caterpillars of a number of Lepidoptera (butterflies and moths), including:

Monophagous
Species which feed exclusively on Artemisia - they are monophagous

 Bucculatricidae
 Several Bucculatrix leaf-miner species:
 B. absinthii
 B. andalusica
 B. artemisiella
 B. atagina – only on field wormwood (A. campestris)
 B. benacicolella – only on A. alba
 B. canariensis – only on A. canariensis
 B. diffusella – only on sea wormwood (A. maritima)
 B. herbalbella – only on white wormwood (A. herba-alba)
 B. koebelella – only on California sagebrush (A. californica)
 B. laciniatella – only on Siberian wormwood (A. laciniata)
 B. leptalea – only on tarragon (A. dranunculus)
 B. noltei – only on common wormwood (A. vulgaris)
 B. pannonica – only on sea wormwood (A. maritima)
 B. ratisbonensis – only on field wormwood (A. campestris)
 B. salutatoria – only on common sagebrush (A. tridentata)
 B. seorsa – only on common sagebrush (A. tridentata)
 B. tridenticola – only on common sagebrush (A. tridentata)
 Coleophoridae
 Several Coleophora case-bearer species:
 C. absinthii – only on absinth wormwood (A. absinthium)
 C. amentastra – only on A. turanica
 C. artemisicolella – only on common wormwood (A. vulgaris)
 C. artemisiella – only on sea wormwood (A. maritima)
 C. directella – only on field wormwood (A. campestris)
 C. dubiella
 C. granulatella – only on field wormwood (A. campestris)
 C. guttella – only on A. turanica
 C. polynella – only on A. turanica
 C. settarii – only on A. crithmifolia
 C. solenella – only on field wormwood (A. campestris)
 C. succursella – only on field wormwood (A. campestris)
 C. yomogiella
 C. zhusani – only on A. turanica
 Noctuidae
 Schinia accessa (angle-lined flower moth) – only on common sagebrush (A. tridentata)
 Schinia cumatilis (silver-banded gem) – only on fringed sagebrush (A. frigida)
 Schinia nuchalis (spotted clover moth) – on field wormwood (A. campestris), tarragon (A. dracunculus) and possibly others

Polyphagous
Species which feed on Artemisia and other plants - they are polyphagous

 Bucculatricidae
 Several Bucculatrix leaf-miner species:
 B. arnicella – recorded on common sagebrush (A. tridentata)
 B. fatigatella – recorded on field wormwood (A. campestris)
 Coleophoridae
 Several Coleophora case-bearer species:
 C. albicella – recorded on A. caerulescens
 C. caelebipennella – recorded on field wormwood (A. campestris)
 C. ditella – recorded on field wormwood (A. campestris)
 C. gardesanella
 C. kurokoi – recorded on Japanese mugwort (A. princeps)
 C. trochilella – recorded on common wormwood (A. vulgaris)
 C. vibicigerella
 Crambidae
 Dolicharthria punctalis – recorded on common wormwood (A. vulgaris)
 Gelechiidae
 Chionodes distinctella – recorded on field wormwood (A. campestris)
 Geometridae
 Chloroclystis v-ata (V-pug) – recorded on common wormwood (A. vulgaris)
 Eupithecia absinthiata (wormwood pug)
 Eupithecia centaureata (lime-speck pug)
 Eupithecia icterata (tawny speckled pug)
 Eupithecia subfuscata (grey pug)
 Eupithecia succenturiata (bordered pug) – recorded on common wormwood (A. vulgaris)
 Eupithecia vulgata (common pug)
 Hemithea aestivaria (common emerald)
 Odontopera bidentata (scalloped hazel) – recorded on common wormwood (A. vulgaris)
 Noctuidae
 Agrotis exclamationis (heart and dart)
 Amphipyra tragopoginis (mouse moth) – recorded on common wormwood (A. vulgaris)
 Antitype chi (grey chi) – recorded on common wormwood (A. vulgaris)
 Naenia typica (Gothic)

External links

Artemisia
.Lepidoptera